Tinoi Christie (born 29 February 1976) is an association football player who represented New Zealand. He played as a midfielder.

Christie made his full All Whites debut as a substitute in a 0–5 loss to Indonesia on 25 September 1997. He was originally named in the New Zealand side for the 1999 Confederations Cup but later omitted from the finals tournament squad. Christie ended his international playing career with 15 A-international caps and 1 goal to his credit, his final cap a substitute appearance in a 0–1 loss to Egypt on 15 July 1999.

He played club football for Hillingdon Borough in England.

References 

1976 births
Living people
New Zealand association footballers
New Zealand international footballers
People educated at St. Patrick's College, Wellington
Association football midfielders
1998 OFC Nations Cup players